The list of ship launches in 2011 includes a chronological list of ships launched in 2011.


References

2011
Ship launches
 
Ship